Adel Bencherif (born 30 May 1975) is a French actor. He is best known for his role in the 2009 film A Prophet.

Filmography
2004: Grande École - Ouvrier flash-back 2 
2004: Safia et Sarah - Un jeune de la cité
2005: Ze film - Aziz
2006: Paris, je t'aime - Le voleur de gutitare (segment "Place des Fetes")
2006: Cages - Rabbah
2006: Djihad! (TV) - Karim
2007: Les Liens du sang (TV) - Abdel
2007: Frontier(s) - Sami
2007: Andalucia directed by Alain Gomis - Farid
2008: Go Fast - Sed
2009: A Prophet (in French Un prophète) directed by Jacques Audiard - Ryad
2010: Of Gods and Men
2011: Sleepless Night
2013: Rock the Casbah
2013: The Dream Kids - Sofiane
2015: Spectre - Abrika
2016: Iris - Malek Ziani
2016: London Has Fallen - Raza Mansoor
2019: War of the Worlds - Colonel Mustafa Mokrani

External links

1975 births
Living people
People from Saint-Maurice, Val-de-Marne
French people of Tunisian descent
French male film actors
French male television actors
21st-century French male actors